

South West (43)

Cornwall (5)

Devon (11)

Somerset (7)

Dorset (4)

Gloucestershire (11)

Wiltshire (5)

South East (including London) (148; 161 in 1945)

Oxfordshire (3)

Buckinghamshire (3; 4 in 1945)

Berkshire (4)

Hampshire (12)

Isle of Wight (1)

Surrey (12; 14 in 1945)

Sussex (9; 10 in 1945)

Kent (15; 17 in 1945)

Middlesex (17; 24 in 1945)

County of London (62) 

See https://commons.wikimedia.org/wiki/Category:Locator_maps_of_former_parliamentary_constituencies_of_England_1917

East Anglia (55; 62 in 1945)

Bedfordshire (3)

Hertfordshire (5; 6 in 1945)

Huntingdonshire (1)

Cambridgeshire (2)

Isle of Ely (1)

Norfolk (8)

Suffolk (6)

Essex (20; 26 in 1945)

West Midlands (55; 58 in 1945)

Shropshire (4)

Staffordshire (18)

Herefordshire (2)

Worcestershire (6)

Warwickshire (17; 20 in 1945)

East Midlands (42)

Derbyshire (10)

Nottinghamshire (9)

Leicestershire (7)

Lincolnshire and Rutland (9)

Northamptonshire (5)

North West (83; 85 from 1945)

Cumberland (5)

Westmorland (1)

Lancashire (65; 66 in 1945)

Cheshire (14; 15 in 1945)

North East (28)

County Durham (18)

Northumberland (10)

Yorkshire (57)

York (1)

East Riding (7)

North Riding (6)

West Riding (43)

England non-geographic (7)

Wales (36)

Anglesey (1)

Caernarvonshire (2)

Denbighshire (2)

Flintshire (1)

Merionethshire (1)

Montgomeryshire (1)

Breconshire and Radnorshire (1)

Cardiganshire (1)

Carmarthenshire (2)

Pembrokeshire (1)

Glamorgan (16)

Monmouthshire (6)

Non-geographic (1)

Scotland (70)

Orkney and Shetland (1)

Caithness and Sutherland (1)

Inverness-shire and Ross and Cromarty (3)

Banffshire (1)

Moray and Nairnshire (1)

Aberdeenshire and Kincardineshire (5)

Forfarshire (4)

Argyll (1)

Perthshire and Kinross-shire (2)

Stirlingshire and Clackmannanshire (3)

Fife (4)

Dunbartonshire (2)

Renfrewshire (4)

Ayrshire and Bute (4)

Lanarkshire (22)

Linlithgowshire (1)

Midlothian and Peeblesshire (8)

Dumfriesshire (1)

Kirkcudbrightshire and Wigtownshire (1)

Roxburghshire and Selkirkshire (1)

Berwickshire and Haddingtonshire (1)

Non-geographic (3)

Northern Ireland (13 - from 1922)

See also 

1918
Parliamentary constituencies
Parliamentary constituencies
Parliamentary constituencies
Parliamentary constituencies